Kocabaş is a belde (town) in Honaz district of Denizli Province, Turkey. The population of Kocabaş was 6420   as of 2012. Although the fertile area round Kocabaş was always populated in the historical ages, the town in the open plains,  is a relatively recent settlement probably because of the security reasons.

References

Populated places in Denizli Province
Towns in Turkey
Honaz District